Easter is the third studio album by the Patti Smith Group. It was released in March 1978 by Arista Records. Produced by Jimmy Iovine, the album is regarded as the group's commercial breakthrough, owing to the success of the rock single "Because the Night" (co-written by Bruce Springsteen and Smith), which reached number 13 on the Billboard Hot 100 and number five on the UK Singles Chart.

History

The first album released since Smith had suffered a neck injury while touring for Radio Ethiopia, Easter has been called the most commercially accessible of the Patti Smith Group's catalogue. Unlike its two predecessors, Easter incorporated a diversity of musical styles, including straightforward rock ("Because the Night"), classic rock and roll ("25th Floor/High on Rebellion", "Rock N Roll Nigger"), folk ("Ghost Dance") and spoken word ("Babelogue"). Easter is the only 1970s album of Smith's that does not feature Richard Sohl as part of the Patti Smith Group; in one interview at the time, Smith stated that Sohl was sick and this prevented him from participating in recording the album. Bruce Brody is credited as the keyboard player, though Sohl makes a guest appearance contributing keyboards to "Space Monkey", along with Blue Öyster Cult keyboardist Allen Lanier. The cover photograph is by Lynn Goldsmith and the liner notes photography by Cindy Black and Robert Mapplethorpe.

Religious imagery
In addition to the religious allusion of its title, the album is replete with biblical and specifically Christian imagery. "Privilege (Set Me Free)" is taken from the British fame- and authoritarianism-satirizing film Privilege; its lyrics are adapted from Psalm 23. The LP insert reproduces a First Communion portrait of Frederic and Arthur Rimbaud, and Smith's notes for the song "Easter" invoke Catholic imagery of baptism, communion and the blood of Christ. A solitary hand-drawn cross is placed below the group member credits on the sleeve insert, and the last sentence of the liner notes is a quote from Second Epistle to Timothy 4:7 -- "I have fought a good fight, I have finished my course ..."

Beyond Christian themes, the song "Ghost Dance" references the Ghost Dance Native American religious revival of the late 19th century.

Critical reception

Easter was highly acclaimed upon its release. Rolling Stone critic Dave Marsh called it "transcendent and fulfilled", while Sandy Robertson proclaimed that "the rock 'n' roll resurrection is upon us" in his review of the album for Sounds. In Creem, Nick Tosches deemed Easter to be Smith's best work, "truer and surer and less uneven than her previous albums". Robert Christgau of The Village Voice felt that the music "is as basic as ever in its instrumentation and rhythmic thrust, but grander, more martial", and that "most of these songs are rousing in the way they're meant to be." Lester Bangs, however, began his review of the album in Phonograph Record, "Dear Patti, start the revolution without me", and contended that while Horses had changed his life, Easter "is just a very good album". Easter placed at number 14 in The Village Voices Pazz & Jop critics' poll of the best albums of 1978, while NME ranked it the 46th best album of the year.

Track listing

Personnel
Patti Smith Group
 Patti Smith – vocals, Duo-Sonic guitar
 Lenny Kaye – Stratocaster guitar, bass guitar, vocals
 Jay Dee Daugherty – drums, percussion
 Ivan Král – bass guitar, vocals, Les Paul guitar
 Bruce Brody – keyboards, synthesizer

Additional personnel
 Richard Sohl – keyboards on "Space Monkey"
 Allen Lanier – keyboards on "Space Monkey"
 John Paul Fetta – bass guitar on "Till Victory" and "Privilege"
 Andi Ostrowe – percussion on "Ghost Dance"
 Jimmy Maxwell – bagpipes on "Easter"
 Tom Verlaine – arrangement on "We Three" (in 1974)
 Todd Smith – head of crew

Technical
 Jimmy Iovine – production, mixing
 Shelly Yakus – mixing
 Greg Calbi – mastering
 Thom Panunzio – engineering
 Gray Russell – engineering
 Charlie Conrad – engineering
 Joe Intile – engineering

Design
 Lynn Goldsmith – cover photography
 Robert Mapplethorpe – insert photography
 Cindy Black – insert photography
 John Roberts – insert photography
 Maude Gilman – insert design

Liner notes
In the insert with the original LP release (reproduced in the 1996 reissue), Smith's self-penned liner notes refer, among other things, to:
 Arthur Rimbaud – 19th century French poet, sometime companion of Paul Verlaine. Lived in Ethiopia for the last 11 years of his life.
 Frédéric Rimbaud – Arthur's brother.
 42nd Street and Ninth Avenue, New York – 1970s crime-ridden zone.
 Privilege – 1967 British movie.
 Ladies and Gentlemen: The Rolling Stones – A concert movie released in 1974.
 Alain Delon – French actor.
 Pier Paolo Pasolini – 1960s Italian poet and film director.
 Bernardo Bertolucci – 1960s Italian writer and film director.
 Jean-Luc Godard – 1960s Franco-Swiss filmmaker.
  – date of Elvis Presley's death.
 Ghost Dance – 19th century religious movement among some Native American tribes.
 r.e.f.m. – Radio Ethiopia Field Marshal.
 Jean Shrimpton – 1960s British model and actress.
 Paul Jones – 1960s British musician and actor.
 Charles Baudelaire – 19th century French poet.
 CBGB – New York music club.
 Little Richard – 20th century American singer-songwriter.
 New Jersey.
 The UN's declaration of 1979 as International Year of the Child.

Charts

Certifications and sales

Release history

References

External links
 
 

1978 albums
Albums produced by Jimmy Iovine
Albums recorded at Record Plant (New York City)
Arista Records albums
Patti Smith albums
Rock albums by American artists